This article is about the particular significance of the decade 1780 - 1789 to Wales and its people.

Incumbents
Prince of Wales - George (later George IV)
Princess of Wales - vacant

Events
1780
1781
1782
1783
1784
1785
1786
1787
1788
1789

Arts and literature

New books 
1780
John Walters - Poems with Notes
1781
Thomas Pennant - Tours in Wales, volume 2
1782
Thomas Pennant - Journey to Snowdon, volume 1
1783
Julia Ann Hatton - Poems on Miscellaneous Subjects
1784
Richard Price - Importance of the American Revolution
1785
Nathaniel Williams - Darllen Dwfr a Meddyginiaeth
1786
David Samwell - A Narrative of the Death of Captain James Cook
Hester Lynch Piozzi - Anecdotes of the late Samuel Johnson, Ll.D., during the last twenty years of his life
1788
Hester Lynch Piozzi - Letters to and from the late Samuel Johnson
1789
Richard Price - Love for our Country

Music
1781
John Parry (harpist) - British Harmony, being a Collection of Antient Welsh Airs
1783
Evan Hughes (Hughes Fawr) - Rhai Hymnau Newyddion o Fawl i'r Oen
1784
Edward Jones (Bardd y Brenin) - The Musical and Poetical Relicks of the Welsh Bards
1787
Nathaniel Williams - Ychydig o Hymnau Newyddion

Births
1780
10 February - James Henry Cotton, Dean of Bangor (died 1862)
14 May - Sir Thomas Frankland Lewis, politician (died 1855)
7 October - Wyndham Lewis, MP (died 1838)
1781
1782
20 January - Sir William Nott, military leader (died 1845)
29 December - Sir William Lloyd, soldier and mountaineer (died 1857)
1783
May - Cadwaladr Jones, minister and literary editor (died 1867)
1784
17 January - Joseph Tregelles Price, ironmaster (died 1854)
date unknown - Walter Coffin, coal-owner (died 1867)
1785
December - Richard Jones (Gwyndaf Eryri), poet (died 1848)
24 December - William Bruce Knight, clergyman and scholar (died 1845)
date unknown - William Owen, historian (died 1864)
1786
1787
2 October - Thomas Price (Carnhuanawc), historian (died 1848)
1788
12 February - William Williams, MP (died 1865)
3 October - John Montgomery Traherne, antiquary (died 1860)
1789
22 April - Richard Roberts, engineer (died 1864)
24 May - Beti Cadwaladr, Crimea nurse (died 1860)

Deaths
1780
6 March - Sir John Meredith, lawyer, 65
1 April - Sir Stephen Glynne, 7th Baronet, 35
date unknown - Richard Thomas, priest and antiquarian, 46
1781
4 April - Henry Thrale, brewer
12 October - David Powell (Dewi Nantbrân), Franciscan friar and author
1782
15 May - Richard Wilson, landscape painter, 54
November - John Parry, harpist
1783
7 August - Thomas Llewellyn, Baptist minister and writer, 63?
6 September - Anna Williams, friend of Dr Johnson, 77?
1784
5 April - David Williams, minister and schoolmaster, 74?
1785
2 February - John Guest, industrialist, 63
20 October - David Jones of Trefriw, poet, 77?
1789
24 July - Sir Watkin Williams-Wynn, 4th Baronet, politician, 39
7 August - William Edwards, minister and bridge-builder, 70
26 November - Elizabeth Baker, diarist, 70?

 
18th century in Wales
Wales
Wales
Decades in Wales